"The Stage" is a song by American heavy metal band Avenged Sevenfold. It was released on 13 October 2016, as the first single from their studio album of the same name.

"The Stage" is featured in the video game Rock Band 4s "More Metal Pack 01" downloadable content. The song was nominated at the 60th Annual Grammy Awards for the "Best Rock Song" category.

Release
The Stage was released on October 13, 2016, as the lead single for their seventh studio album.

Music video
The official music video was released to YouTube on October 13, 2016. The video shows a puppet show, depicting humans throughout history killing each other, until the present day, which shows politicians as puppets pulling strings of the crowd. At the end of the video, a reaper-like creature is shown pulling the strings of politicians, and it presses a "reset button", going back to the beginning of mankind.

Accolades

Charts

Personnel
Avenged Sevenfold
M. Shadows – lead vocals
Zacky Vengeance – rhythm guitar, backing vocals
Synyster Gates – lead guitar, classical guitar, backing vocals
Johnny Christ – bass guitar, backing vocals
Brooks Wackerman – drums

Additional musician
Jason Freese – keyboards

References

Avenged Sevenfold songs
2016 songs
2016 singles
Progressive metal songs